Mercury is a 1996 Australian television series about the editors and reporters of the Sunday Mercury, a fictional Melbourne weekly paper. The series is notable for featuring Geoffrey Rush in a lead role, and originally aired on ABC for a single series of 13 hour-long episodes.

References
 

Television shows set in Melbourne
1996 Australian television series debuts
1996 Australian television series endings